Dedridge is an area in the town of Livingston in West Lothian, Scotland. It is located in the south of the town, just south of the Almondvale area, and north of the Murieston area.

The area's streets are named after parts, events or characters from the plays of Sir Walter Scott; with the suffix 'Rise' being appended to give street names such as Clement Rise, Crusader Rise and Ivanhoe Rise.

Community information
There are two community centres in Dedridge: the Lanthorn (Kenilworth Rise) and Crofthead Farm (Templar Rise). There is a public library in the Lanthorn. Dedridge Health Centre is in Nigel Rise and has a dental practice attached.

There are two ponds in the area: Dedridge Pond, just south of Kenilworth Rise, and one adjacent to Staunton Rise.    Dedridge Pond and the surrounding Dedridge Burn Plantation area are cared for by Dedridge Environment Ecology Project.

Dedridge Pond has artwork in the form of a damselfly sculpture.

Most housing in Dedridge is terraced houses built by Livingston Development Corporation. The original landscaping of Dedridge made an effort to break up housing areas with natural features, and there are a number of small woodland areas cared for by The Woodland Trust.

A small newsletter (Dedridge Grapevine) with local news stories is circulated in Dedridge with 10 issues per year, edited by the same person for more than 30 years.

There are three care homes in Dedridge, the first is Crusader Court located in Crusader Rise, the second is Woodlands Care Home located in Quentin Rise and the last located in Templar Rise.

Schools
Dedridge has one high school, The James Young High School, which is located in Quentin Rise. There are three primary schools: St. Ninian's RC Primary School located in Douglas Rise, Bankton Primary School in Kenilworth Rise, and Dedridge Primary School (in Dedridge East).

Shops
The main Livingston shopping centre Shopping in Livingston is just to the north of Dedridge and so the area only has a few small local shops in Templar Rise, Nigel Rise and Douglas Rise.

Churches
One of the Livingston Ecumenical Parish worship centres is located in the Lanthorn Community Centre, where they have a small chapel, but use the main hall for regular services. The Roman Catholic church have a separate chapel (St Philip's) at the Lanthorn.  The Dedridge Baptist Church is located in Quentin Rise.
Recently (2017) kings church West Lothian has started a service in the Lanthorn Center that starts at 3pm. It was started by kings Church Edinburgh.

Trivia
Navigation in Dedridge is really simple as the streets progress in alphabetical order, starting at Abbotsford Rise and ending at Templar Rise (with the exception of Palmer Rise, which comes between Kenilworth and Mowbray Rises).

External links
http://www.livingstoni.co.uk/dedridge.htm

References

Livingston, West Lothian
Populated places in West Lothian